Prairie Township is one of 37 townships in Washington County, Arkansas, USA. As of the 2000 census, its total population was 3,526.

Geography
The township has been fragmented by the expansion of Fayetteville and thus Fayetteville Township. Prairie now consists of two main segments along Fayetteville's eastern edge and three very small segments on Fayetteville's west side.

The township gave part to Reed Township in 1880 and part to Wyman Township between 1890 and 1900.

Cities, towns, villages
Habberton

Cemeteries
The township contains Hester Cemetery and St. Joseph Cemetery.

Major routes
  Arkansas Highway 45

References

 United States Census Bureau 2008 TIGER/Line Shapefiles

External links
 US-Counties.com
 City-Data.com

Townships in Washington County, Arkansas
Populated places established in 1829
Townships in Arkansas